Theil may refer to:

Archaic variant spelling of German for 'part' (modern High German "Teil"), for example "Erster Theil etlicher Choräle"

People with surname Theil 
 Anders Theil (1970), Danish football manager
 Henri Theil (1924-2000), Dutch econometrician
 Georges Theil (born 1940), French politician
 Pernille Rosenkrantz-Theil (1977), former member of Danish parliament

See also 
Theil index, a statistical algorithm used to measure economic inequality
Theil–Sen estimator, a statistical linear graph method
Theil's U, a measure of nominal association also known as the uncertainty coefficient principle
Le Theil, a French commune name
Thiel, an etymologically related (and commonly misspelled variant) surname

German-language surnames
Danish-language surnames
Dutch-language surnames